Davis Madava Steven is a Papua New Guinea politician. He is a Member of the Papua New Guinea National Parliament, representing the seat of Esa'ala Open since 2012. Steven served as the Deputy Prime Minister of Papua New Guinea from 2019 to 2020 due to a cabinet reshuffle by prime minister Marape.

Early life 
Steven completed his secondary education at Wesley High School and Sogeri National High School. In 1990, he earned a bachelor's degree in Law from the University of Papua New Guinea, and was admitted to the Bar at the Legal Training Institute in 1991. Prior to his election, he was a private practitioner with Stevens Lawyers.

Political career 
He was elected to the 9th National Parliament for the Esa'ala Open seat in the 2012 general elections, representing the People's Party. He was then appointed as Minister for Civil Aviation in the O'Neill-Dion cabinet. He was re-elected in the 2017 general elections, as a member of People's National Congress. He was appointed Minister for Justice and Attorney-General in the O'Neill-Abel Cabinet following the formation of Government in August 2017.

On 18 April 2019, he resigned as Minister for Justice and Attorney-General, and left People's National Congress.

On 7 June 2019, he was appointed and sworn in as Deputy Prime Minister of Papua New Guinea in the First Marape Cabinet, serving until 2020.

References

Members of the National Parliament of Papua New Guinea
Living people
Year of birth missing (living people)
Government ministers of Papua New Guinea
University of Papua New Guinea alumni
People's National Congress (Papua New Guinea) politicians